Bieganowo Palace - eclectic palace with elements of neoclassicism in Bieganowo (Września County, Poland), built between 1914 and 1916, designed by Stefan Cybichowski for Edward Grabski.

Description 
Building on a rectangular plan, with a mansard roof, with symmetrically placed alcoves. The axis of the entrance facade is decorated with pillared portico topped with a triangular pediment. On the garden side, there is a large terrace decorated with sculptures.

History 
Grzymalici Bieganowscy owned the palace until the seventeenth century. In 1880 it was owned by Stanisław Bronisz and in the twentieth century, it belonged to the Grabski family. In 1939 it was owned by Edward Grabski.

Gallery

Sources 
 .
 .

External links 
  Bieganowo - Polish monuments
  Bieganowo - palace

Gmina Kołaczkowo
Bieganowo